Ceara O'Neill is an English actress and musician. She is notable for her work in television, including Young Victoria,  starring Emily Blunt, TV sitcom The Inbetweeners starring Simon Bird, TV sitcom Him and Her, and BBC TV medical series Holby City. Ceara O'Neill is also the guitarist and backing vocalist for all-sister rock band Kyneska.

Background
Ceara O'Neill was born in Huntingdon, Cambridgeshire. She was a gifted tennis player, and the highest ranked player for her age in Britain aged 10&U. In 2001 she reached the finals of the International Tennis Event 'Top 10-12' in Bressuire, France, beating Alizé Cornet in the semi-finals.

In 2004 when aged 14, she turned professional, competing in $10,000 ITF events in Portugal, before turning to a career in acting and music.

Career
 Him & Her (2013) - Paula
 Holby City (2013) - Nurse
 McDonald's Advert (2009) - Voiceover
 The Young Victoria (2009) - Maid
 The Inbetweeners (2008) - Partygoer
 The Knowledge of Beauty (2008) - Jenny
 My Family Christmas Special (2006) - Carol Singer
 Endeavour (2014) - Personal Assistant

Discography
 Album: Emerald Sky - Shadows of Darkness (2008) - Guitarist and backing vocals

References

External links
Official website

Living people
English television actresses
People from Huntingdon
English film actresses
Actresses from Cambridgeshire
Year of birth missing (living people)